Marco Túlio Gregório Machado (born 3 November 1991) is a Brazilian weightlifter. He won the bronze medal in the men's 96kg event at the 2022 South American Games held in Asunción, Paraguay. He is also a two-time silver medalist at the Pan American Weightlifting Championships.

Career 

He won the silver medal in the men's 94kg event at the 2017 Pan American Weightlifting Championships held in Miami, United States. He also won the silver medal in the men's 96kg event at the 2022 Pan American Weightlifting Championships held in Bogotá, Colombia.

He also represented Brazil at the Pan American Games in 2015 and 2019. He competed in the men's 94kg event in 2015 and in the men's 96kg event in 2019. He finished in 6th place at the 2015 Pan American Games; this became 5th place after the disqualification of Norik Vardanian of the United States.

He won the bronze medal in the men's 96kg event at the 2022 South American Games held in Asunción, Paraguay. He competed in the men's 96kg event at the 2022 World Weightlifting Championships in Bogotá, Colombia.

Achievements

References

External links 
 

Living people
1991 births
Place of birth missing (living people)
Brazilian male weightlifters
Pan American Games competitors for Brazil
Weightlifters at the 2015 Pan American Games
Weightlifters at the 2019 Pan American Games
Pan American Weightlifting Championships medalists
South American Games bronze medalists for Brazil
South American Games medalists in weightlifting
Competitors at the 2022 South American Games
21st-century Brazilian people